This is a list of lighthouses in the province of Ontario, Canada.

Lighthouses

See also

 List of lighthouses in Canada
 Imperial Towers (a group of lighthouses in the list)

References

External links

Ontario

Lighthouses